St. Peter's Church, Clayworth is a parish church in the Church of England in Clayworth, Nottinghamshire.

The church is Grade I listed by the Department for Digital, Culture, Media and Sport as a building of outstanding architectural or historic interest.

History

The church dates from the early part of the 11th century. A substantial restoration was done by John Oldrid Scott in 1874 to 1875.

The church is in a joint parish with:
Holy Trinity Church, Everton
St Peter & St Paul's Church, Gringley-on-the-Hill
All Saints' Church, Mattersey

Features

It is notable for the murals painted by Phoebe Anna Traquair.

Bells

There are eight bells in the tower. The two smallest were cast by John Taylor of Loughborough in 1998. Bells 3 and 4 were cast by the same company in 1951. The fifth was cast in 1897 by John Warner and Sons, London. The sixth was cast by Daniel Hedderly of Bawtry in 1722. The seventh is by George Oldfield I of Nottingham from 1629. The tenor is by William Oldfield of Doncaster in 1652.

Sources

The Buildings of England, Nottinghamshire. Nikolaus Pevsner

Grade I listed churches in Nottinghamshire
Church of England church buildings in Nottinghamshire